Gerard Curtis Delano, often credited as Jerry Delano, (April 14, 1890 – 1972) was a painter and illustrator of the American west.

Delano was born in Marion, Massachusetts. He served in the US Navy in the First World War, then worked on a ranch in Colorado, before moving to New York City to study art. For many years he lived and painted in Denver, Colorado and Summit County, Colorado.

Career
In his early artistic years, Delano:
 Illustrated magazines such as Cosmopolitan, Collier's Weekly and Western Stories
 Painted scenes for calendar companies
 Drew comic illustrations for magazines both in the USA, such as Life and Puck, as well as Punch in Britain.

During his later years, his painting focused on depictions of Navajo people, red sandstone canyons, and wildlife. His style shows some Cubist influences.

The saguaro cactus as a symbol of the West
In 1940, Delano painted Navajo Shepherdess, placed in Monument Valley. In it he placed a saguaro cactus, although it was well outside the naturally occurring area for this plant. It is believed to be the first illustrative use of the plant to symbolize the American West, which has become almost ubiquitous.

Education
 Art Students League of New York
 Grand Central School of Art, New York

References
 Bowman, Richard G., 1990. Walking With Beauty: The Art and Life of Gerard Curtis Delano. Niwot, Colo.: University Press of Colorado.

External links
 National Museum of Wildlife Art
 Beauty in Navajoland

1890 births
1972 deaths
Artists of the American West
20th-century American painters
American male painters
American illustrators
Painters from Colorado
20th-century American male artists